This is a list of theatre companies with membership of the Theatre Communications Group (TCG) in the United States.

A
1812 Productions, Philadelphia, Pennsylvania
The 52nd Street Project, New York
7 Stages, Atlanta, Georgia
About Face Theatre, Chicago, Illinois
Academy Theatre, Avondale Estates, Georgia
ACT Theatre, Seattle, Washington
The Acting Company, New York City, New York
Actor's Express, Atlanta, Georgia
The Actors' Gang, Culver City, California
Actors' Guild Of Lexington, Lexington, Kentucky
Actor's Theatre of Charlotte, Charlotte, North Carolina
Actors Theatre of Louisville, Louisville, Kentucky
Actors Theatre of Phoenix, Phoenix, Arizona
Adirondack Theatre Festival, Glens Falls, New York
The African Continuum Theatre Company, Washington, D.C.
Alabama Shakespeare Festival, Montgomery, Alabama
Alley Theatre, Houston, Texas
Alliance Theatre Company, Atlanta, Georgia
Amas Musical Theatre, Inc., New York City, New York
American Conservatory Theater, San Francisco, California
American Folklore Theatre, Fish Creek, Wisconsin
American Players Theatre, Spring Green, Wisconsin
American Repertory Theater, Cambridge, Massachusetts
American Shakespeare Center, Staunton, Virginia
American Stage, St. Petersburg, Florida
American Theater Company, Chicago, Illinois
American Theatre Company, Tulsa, Oklahoma
Arden Theatre Company, Philadelphia, Pennsylvania
Arena Stage, Washington, D.C.
Arizona Theatre Company, Tucson, Arizona
The Arkansas Arts Center Children's Theatre, Little Rock, Arkansas
Arkansas Repertory Theatre, Little Rock, Arkansas
Artists Repertory Theatre, Portland, Oregon
Arts Center of Coastal Carolina, Hilton Head, South Carolina
Arvada Center for the Arts and Humanities, Arvada, Colorado
Asolo Theatre Company, Sarasota, Florida
Atlanta Shakespeare Company at the Shakespeare Tavern, Atlanta, Georgia
Atlantic Theater Company, New York City, New York
Aurora Theatre Company, Berkeley, California

B
B Street Theatre, Sacramento, California
Barksdale Theatre, Richmond, Virginia
Barrington Stage Company, Pittsfield, Massachusetts
Bay Street Theatre Festival, Inc., Sag Harbor, New York
Berkeley Repertory Theatre,  Berkeley, California
Berkshire Theatre Festival,  Stockbridge, Massachusetts
Bilingual Foundation of the Arts, Los Angeles, California
Blank Theatre Company, Los Angeles, California
Bloomsburg Theatre Ensemble, Bloomsburg, Pennsylvania
BoarsHead Theater, Lansing, Michigan
Boise Contemporary Theater, Boise, Idaho
Book-It Repertory Theatre, Seattle, Washington
Borderlands Theater, Tucson, Arizona
Boston Theatre Works, Boston, Massachusetts
Brat Productions, Philadelphia, Pennsylvania
Brava Theater Center, San Francisco, California
Bristol Riverside Theatre, Bristol, Pennsylvania
Burning Coal Theatre Company, Raleigh, North Carolina
 Bushfire Theatre,  Philadelphia, Pennsylvania

C
Cal Rep, Long Beach, California
California Shakespeare Theater, Berkeley, California
California Theatre Center, Sunnyvale, California
Cape Cod Theatre Project, Falmouth, Massachusetts
Capital Repertory Theatre, Albany, New York
Castillo Theatre, New York
Center for New Theater at Cal Arts, Valencia, California
Center for Puppetry Arts, Atlanta, Georgia
Center Theatre Group, Los Angeles, California
Centerstage, Baltimore, Maryland
Centre Stage, Greenville's Professional Theater, Greenville, South Carolina
Charleston Stage Company, Charleston, South Carolina
Cherry Lane Theatre, New York City, New York
Chicago Dramatists, Chicago, Illinois
Chicago Shakespeare Theater, Chicago, Illinois
Children's Theatre Company, Minneapolis, Minnesota
Childsplay Inc., Tempe, Arizona
The Cider Mill Playhouse, Endicott, New York
Cincinnati Shakespeare Company, Cincinnati, Ohio
City Garage, Santa Monica, California
City Theatre, Miami, Florida
City Theatre Company, Pittsburgh, Pennsylvania
The Civilians, New York City, New York
Clarence Brown Theatre Company, Knoxville, Tennessee
Classic Stage Company, New York City, New York
Classical Theatre of Harlem, New York City, New York
The Cleveland Play House, Cleveland, Ohio
Cleveland Public Theatre, Cleveland, Ohio
Collaboraction, Chicago, Illinois
Colony Theatre Company, Burbank, California
Columbus Children's Theatre, Columbus, Ohio
Commonweal Theatre Company, Lanesboro, Minnesota
Company Of Fools, Hailey, Idaho
Congo Square Theatre, Chicago, Illinois
Connecticut Repertory Theatre, Storrs, Connecticut
Contemporary American Theater Festival, Shepherdstown, West Virginia
Cornerstone Theater Company, Los Angeles, California
The Coterie Theatre, Kansas City, Missouri
Court Theatre, Chicago, Illinois
Creede Repertory Theatre, Creede, Colorado
Curious Theatre Company, Denver, Colorado
Cyrano's Theatre Company, Anchorage, Alaska

D – F
Dad's Garage Theatre Company, Atlanta, Georgia
Dallas Children's Theater, Dallas, Texas
Dallas Theater Center, Dallas, Texas
Deaf West Theatre, North Hollywood, California
Delaware Theatre Company, Wilmington, Delaware
Dell’Arte International, Blue Lake, California
Denver Center Theatre Company, Denver, Colorado
Depot Theatre, Westport, New York
Detroit Repertory Theatre, Detroit, Michigan
Dobama Theatre, Cleveland Heights, Ohio
Double Edge Theatre, Ashfield, Massachusetts
East West Players, Los Angeles, California
The Empty Space Theatre, Seattle, Washington
Ensemble Studio Theatre, New York City, New York
The Ensemble Theatre, Houston, Texas
Ensemble Theatre Company, Santa Barbara, California
Ensemble Theatre of Cincinnati, Cincinnati, Ohio
Eugene O'Neill Theater Center, Waterford, Connecticut
Everyman Theatre, Baltimore, Maryland
First Stage Children's Theater, Milwaukee, Wisconsin
Florida Stage, Manalapan, Florida
Florida Studio Theatre, Sarasota, Florida
Folger Theatre, Washington, D.C.
The Foothill Theatre Co, Nevada City, California
Ford's Theatre, Washington, D.C.
The Foundry Theatre, New York City, New York
Fountain Theatre, Los Angeles, California
Free Street Programs, Chicago, Illinois

G – J
GableStage, Coral Gables, Florida
Gainesville Theatre, Gainesville, Georgia
GALA Hispanic Theatre, Washington, D.C.
Gamm Theatre, Pawtucket, Rhode Island
Gamut Theatre Group, Harrisburg, Pennsylvania
Geffen Playhouse, Los Angeles, California
George Street Playhouse, New Brunswick, New Jersey
Georgia Shakespeare Festival, Atlanta, Georgia
Geva Theatre Center, Rochester, New York
Golden Thread Productions, San Francisco, California
Goodman Theatre, Chicago, Illinois
Great Lakes Theater Festival, Cleveland, Ohio
Greenbrier Valley Theatre, Lewisburg, West Virginia
Growing Stage Theatre For Young Audiences, Netcong, New Jersey
Guthrie Theater, Minneapolis, Minnesota
Hangar Theatre, Ithaca, New York
Harlequin Productions, Olympia, Washington
HartBeat Ensemble, Hartford, Connecticut
Hartford Stage, Hartford, Connecticut
Harwich Junior Theatre and Harwich Winter Theatre, West Harwich, Massachusetts
History Theatre, Saint Paul, Minnesota
Honolulu Theatre for Youth, Honolulu, Hawaii
Horizon Theatre Company, Atlanta, Georgia
Human Race Theatre Company, Dayton, Ohio
Huntington Theatre Company, [[Boston, Massachusetts
Hyde Park Theatre, Austin, Texas
The Hypocrites, Chicago, Illinois
Idaho Shakespeare Festival, Boise, Idaho
Illinois Theatre Center, Park Forest, Illinois
Illusion Theater, Minneapolis, Minnesota
Indiana Repertory Theatre, Indianapolis, Indiana
INTAR Hispanic American Arts Center, New York City, New York
InterAct Theatre Company, Philadelphia, Pennsylvania
International City Theatre, Long Beach, California
Intiman Theatre, Seattle, Washington
Invisible Theatre Company, Tucson, Arizona
Irish Classical Theatre Company, Buffalo, New York
Irondale Ensemble Project, Brooklyn, New York

J – L
Jewish Theater of New York, New York City, New York
Jewish Theatre of the South, Dunwoody, Georgia
The John Drew Theater, East Hampton, New York
The Jungle Theater, Minneapolis, Minnesota
Kansas City Repertory Theatre, Kansas City, Missouri
The Kavinoky Theatre, Buffalo, New York]]
Kennedy Center - Youth And Family Programs, Arlington, Virginia
Kentucky Repertory Theatre, Horse Cave, Kentucky
Kentucky Shakespeare Festival, Louisville, Kentucky
Kitchen Dog Theater, Dallas, Texas
Kitchen Theatre Company, Ithaca, New York
Know Theatre of Cincinnati, Cincinnati, Ohio
L.A. Theatre Works, Venice, California
La Jolla Playhouse, La Jolla, California
La MaMa Experimental Theatre, New York City, New York
LAByrinth Theater Company, New York City, New York
Laguna Playhouse, Laguna Beach, California
Lantern Theater Company, Philadelphia, Pennsylvania
Lark Play Development Center, New York City, New York
Lincoln Center Theater, New York City, New York
Long Wharf Theatre, New Haven, Connecticut
Lookingglass Theatre Company, Chicago, Illinois
Los Angeles Women's Shakespeare Company, Los Angeles, California
Lost Nation Theater, Montpelier, Vermont
The Lyric Stage Company of Boston, Boston, Massachusetts

M
Ma-Yi Theater Company, New York City, New York
Mabou Mines, New York City, New York
Mad River Theater Works, West Liberty, Ohio
Madison Repertory Theatre, Madison, Wisconsin
Magic Theatre, Inc., San Francisco, California
Main Street Theater, Houston, Texas
Manhattan Ensemble Theater, New York City, New York
Manhattan Theatre Club, New York City, New York
Marin Shakespeare Company, San Rafael, California
Marin Theatre Company, Mill Valley, California
Maryland Ensemble Theatre, Frederick, Maryland
McCarter Theatre Center, Princeton, New Jersey
Meadow Brook Theatre, Rochester, Michigan
Melting Pot Theatre Company, New York City, New York
Merrimack Repertory, Lowell, Massachusetts
Merry Go-Round Playhouse, Auburn, New York
Metro Theater Company, St. Louis, Missouri
Milwaukee Chamber Theatre, Milwaukee, Wisconsin
Milwaukee Repertory Theater, Milwaukee, Wisconsin
Milwaukee Shakespeare Company, Milwaukee, Wisconsin
Mint Theater Company, New York City, New York
Miracle Theatre Group, Portland, Oregon
Mirror Repertory Company, New York City, New York
Mixed Blood Theatre Company, Minneapolis, Minnesota
Montana Repertory Theatre, Missoula, Montana
Montgomery Theater, Souderton, Pennsylvania
Moving Arts, Los Angeles, California
Mu Performing Arts, Minneapolis, Minnesota
Mum Puppettheatre, Philadelphia, Pennsylvania
My Fair Heathen Productions, Brooklyn, New York

N – O
Native Voices at the Autry, Los Angeles, California
Nautilus Music-Theater, Saint Paul, Minnesota
Nebraska Repertory Theatre, Lincoln, Nebraska
Nevada Shakespeare Company, Reno, Nevada
New American Theater, Rockford, Illinois
New Conservatory Theatre Center, San Francisco, California
New Dramatists, New York
New Federal Theatre, Inc., New York City, New York
New Georges, New York City, New York
New Ground Theatre, Davenport, Iowa
The New Harmony Theatre, Evansville, Indiana
New Jersey Repertory Company, Long Branch, New Jersey
The New Orleans Shakespeare Festival at Tulane, New Orleans, Louisiana
New Paradise Laboratories, Philadelphia, Pennsylvania
New Professional Theatre, New York City, New York
New Repertory Theatre, Watertown, Massachusetts
New Stage Theatre, Jackson, Mississippi
New Theatre, Coral Gables, Florida
New World Theater, Amherst, Massachusetts
New York State Theatre, Troy, New York
New York Theatre Workshop, New York City, New York
Next Act Theatre, Milwaukee, Wisconsin
The Next Theatre Company, Evanston, Illinois
A Noise Within, Glendale, California
North Carolina Stage Company, Asheville, North Carolina
North Coast Repertory, Solana Beach, California
North Star Theatre, Mandeville, Louisiana
Northern Stage, White River Junction, Vermont
Northlight Theatre, Skokie, Illinois
Northwest Children's Theater and School, Portland, Oregon
Northwest Classical Theatre Company, Portland, Oregon
Odyssey Theatre Ensemble, Los Angeles, California
The Old Globe, San Diego, California
Olney Theatre Center, Olney, Maryland
Omaha Theater Company For Young People, Omaha, Nebraska
Ontological-Hysteric Theater, New York City, New York
The Open Eye Theater, Margaretville, New York
Open Stage Of Harrisburg, Harrisburg, Pennsylvania
OpenStage Theatre and Company, Fort Collins, Colorado
Oregon Children's Theatre, Portland, Oregon
Oregon Contemporary Theatre, Eugene, Oregon
Oregon Shakespeare Festival, Ashland, Oregon
Orlando Shakespeare Theater, Orlando, Florida
Out Of Hand Theater, Atlanta, Georgia

P
Palm Beach Dramaworks, West Palm Beach, Florida
Pan Asian Repertory Theatre, New York
Pangea World Theater, Minneapolis, Minnesota
Paper Mill Playhouse, Millburn, New Jersey
Pasadena Playhouse, Pasadena, California
Passage Theatre Company, Trenton, New Jersey
PCPA Theaterfest, Santa Maria, California
Pegasus Players Theatre, Chicago, Illinois
Peninsula Players Theatre, Fish Creek, Wisconsin
Pennsylvania Shakespeare Festival, Center Valley, Pennsylvania
Penobscot Theatre Company, Bangor, Maine
Penumbra Theatre Company, Saint Paul, Minnesota
The People's Light And Theatre Company, Malvern, Pennsylvania
Performance Network, Ann Arbor, Michigan
Perishable Theatre, Providence, Rhode Island
Perseverance Theatre, Douglas, Alaska
Peterborough Players, Peterborough, New Hampshire
The Philadelphia Shakespeare Festival, Philadelphia, Pennsylvania
Philadelphia Theatre Company, Philadelphia, Pennsylvania
Phoenix Theatre, Phoenix, Arizona
Phoenix Theatre, Inc., Indianapolis, Indiana
Pick Up Performance Company, New York City, New York
Pig Iron Theatre Company, Philadelphia, Pennsylvania
Pillsbury House Theatre, Minneapolis, Minnesota
Ping Chong And Company, New York City, New York
Pioneer Theatre Company, Salt Lake City, Utah
Pittsburgh Irish and Classical Theatre, Pittsburgh, Pennsylvania
Pittsburgh Public Theater, Pittsburgh, Pennsylvania
Piven Theatre Workshop, Evanston, Illinois
PlayGround, San Francisco, California
Playhouse on the Square, Memphis, Tennessee
Playhouse West, Walnut Creek, California
PlayMakers Repertory Company, Chapel Hill, North Carolina
The Playwrights' Center, Minneapolis, Minnesota
Playwrights Horizons, New York City, New York
Playwrights Theatre Of New Jersey, Madison, New Jersey
Plowshares Theatre Co, Detroit, Michigan
Portland Center Stage, Portland, Oregon
Portland Stage Company, Portland, Maine
Pregones Theater, Bronx, New York
Primary Stages Theater, New York City, New York
ProArts Collective of Austin, Austin, Texas
Profile Theatre Project, Portland, Oregon
The Public Theatre, Auburn, Maine
The Public Theater, New York City, New York
PushPush Theater, Decatur, Georgia

R – S
Red Barn Theatre, Key West, Florida
Redmoon Theater, Chicago, Illinois
Renaissance Theaterworks, Milwaukee, Wisconsin
The Repertory Theatre of St. Louis, St. Louis, Missouri
River Stage, Sacramento, California
Riverlight And Co, Battle Creek, Michigan
Riverside Theatre, Iowa City, Iowa
Roadside Theater, Norton, Virginia
Round House Theatre, Bethesda, Maryland
Roundabout Theatre Company, New York
Roxy Regional Theatre, Clarksville, Tennessee
Rude Mechanicals, Austin, Texas 
Saint Michael's Playhouse, Colchester, Vermont
The Salt Lake Acting Company, Salt Lake City, Utah
Salvage Vanguard Theater, Austin, Texas
San Diego Repertory, San Diego, California
San Jose Repertory Theatre, San Jose, California
Seattle Children's Theatre, Seattle, Washington
Seattle Public Theater, Seattle, Washington
Seattle Repertory Theatre, Seattle, Washington
Seattle Shakespeare Company, Seattle, Washington
Second Stage Theatre, New York City, New York
Shakespeare & Company, Lenox, Massachusetts
Shakespeare Santa Cruz, Santa Cruz, California
Shakespeare Theatre Company, Washington, D.C.
The Shakespeare Theatre of New Jersey, Madison, New Jersey
Shattered Globe Theatre, Chicago, Illinois
Shotgun Players, Berkeley, California
Sierra Repertory Theatre, Sonora, California
Signature Theatre, Arlington, Virginia
Signature Theatre Company, New York City, New York
SITI Company, New York City, New York
Society Hill Playhouse, Philadelphia, Pennsylvania
Solano College Theatre, Fairfield, California
South Coast Repertory, Costa Mesa, California
South Coast Theatre Company, New Bedford, Massachusetts
Southern Rep, New Orleans, Louisiana
Southwest Ensemble Theatre, Phoenix, Arizona
Southwest Shakespeare Company, Mesa, Arizona
Speakeasy Stage Company, Boston, Massachusetts
St Louis Black Repertory Company, St. Louis, Missouri
Stage One: The Louisville Children's Theatre, Inc., Louisville, Kentucky
Stages Repertory Theatre, Houston, Texas
Stages Theatre Center, Los Angeles, California
Stages Theatre Company, Hopkins, Minnesota
StageWorks/Hudson, Hudson, New York
Stark Raving Theatre, Portland, Oregon
State Theater Company, Austin, Texas
Steppenwolf Theatre Company, Chicago, Illinois
The Studio Theatre, Washington, D.C.
The Sugan Theatre Company, Cambridge, Massachusetts
Sundance Theatre, Beverly Hills, California
Swine Palace, Baton Rouge, Louisiana
Synchronicity Performance Group, Atlanta, Georgia
Syracuse Stage, Syracuse, New York

T – U
TADA!, New York
Talking Band, New York City, New York
Taproot Theatre Company, Seattle, Washington
Target Margin Theater, Brooklyn, New York
Teatro del Pueblo, Saint Paul, Minnesota
Teatro Vision de San Jose, San Jose, California
Teatro Vista, Chicago, Illinois
Ten Thousand Things Theater Company, Minneapolis, Minnesota
Tennessee Repertory Theatre, Nashville, Tennessee
Thalía Spanish Theatre, Long Island City, New York
Theater Alliance, Washington, D.C.
The Theater at Monmouth, Monmouth, Maine
Theater By the Blind, New York City, New York
Theater for the New City, New York City, New York
Theater Grottesco, Santa Fe, New Mexico
Theater J, Washington, D.C.
Theater of the First Amendment, Fairfax, Virginia
Theater on Main, Oconomowoc, Wisconsin
Theater Previews at Duke, Durham, North Carolina
The Theater Project, Cranford, New Jersey
Theatre Aspen, Aspen, Colorado
Theatre de la Jeune Lune, Minneapolis, Minnesota
Theatre For A New Audience, New York City, New York
Theatre Project, Baltimore, Maryland
Theatre West,  Los Angeles, California
TheatreSquared, Fayetteville, Arkansas
Theatreworks,  Palo Alto, California
Theatrical Outfit, Atlanta, Georgia
Touchstone Theatre,  Bethlehem, Pennsylvania
Traveling Jewish Theatre, San Francisco, California
Triad Stage,  Greensboro, North Carolina
Tricklock Theatre Company,  Albuquerque, New Mexico
Trinity Repertory Company,  Providence, Rhode Island
True Colors Theatre Company,  Atlanta, Georgia
Trustus Theatre,  Columbia, South Carolina
Two River Theater Company,  Red Bank, New Jersey
Undermain Theatre, Dallas, Texas
Unicorn Theatre,  Kansas City, Missouri
Urban Stages,  New York
Utah Shakespearean Festival,  Cedar City, Utah

V – Z
Valley Youth Theatre,  Phoenix, Arizona
Vermont Stage Company,  Burlington, Vermont
Victory Gardens Theater,  Chicago, Illinois
Vineyard Playhouse,  Vineyard Haven, Massachusetts
Vineyard Theatre, New York
Virginia Stage Company,  Norfolk, Virginia
Vital Theatre Company,  New York
Voices of the South,  Memphis, Tennessee
Walden Theatre, Louisville, Kentucky
The Warehouse Theatre, Greenville, South Carolina
WaterTower Theatre, Addison, Texas
Wellfleet Harbor Actors Theater, Wellfleet, Massachusetts
West Coast Ensemble, Los Angeles, California
The Western Stage, Salinas, California
Weston Playhouse, Weston, Vermont
Westport Country Playhouse, Westport, Connecticut
Wheelock Family Theatre, Boston, Massachusetts
William Inge Center for the Arts, Independence, Kansas
Williamstown Theatre Festival, Williamstown, Massachusetts
The Wilma Theater, Philadelphia, Pennsylvania
Wing-It Productions, Seattle, Washington
Women's Project & Productions,  New York
Woolly Mammoth Theatre Company, Washington, D.C.
The Wooster Group, New York City, New York
Working Classroom, Albuquerque, New Mexico
The Working Theater, New York City, New York
Writers' Theatre, Glencoe, Illinois
Yale Repertory Theatre, New Haven, Connecticut
Young Playwrights' Theater, Washington, D.C.
Youth Ensemble of Atlanta, Atlanta, Georgia
The Z Space Studio, San Francisco, California
Zachary Scott Theatre Center, Austin, Texas

See also
List of LORT member theatres

References

Lists of theatres in the United States